David (Ninov) (born 27 July 1972) is an Eastern Orthodox titular Bishop of Stobi and administrator of the Eparchy of Strumica of the Orthodox Ohrid Archbishopric, an autonomous church in the Republic of Macedonia, under the supreme jurisdiction of Serbian Orthodox Church.

Biography
After graduating at High school for cultural sciences in Skopje, he studied ancient Greek and Latin philology at Institute for classical studies, at state Ss. Cyril and Methodius University of Skopje. He continued higher education in Greece and graduated theology at the Theological faculty of the state Aristotle University of Thessaloniki. Holds a master's degree (MTheol) from the same faculty at Aristotle University, Sector of Dogmatics, History of Philosophy and Ecumenical Theology.

Before entering monastic life he was the editor of the periodicals for literature, art and culture and worked in the Editorial for Culture at the national television in Skopje. He published several books of poetry, and received literary awards; his works are part of several poetic anthologies, in different languages.

He entered monastic life in 1995 and was ordained a deacon in 1996 and priest in 1997. After the rejection of Niš agreement (2002) by the majority of leaders of Macedonian Orthodox Church, he joined metropolitan Jovan Vraniškovski in his attempts to restore canonical order of the Eastern Orthodox Church in the Republic of Macedonia, and on 11 January 2004 he was received in full canonical communion. Because of that, he was persecuted by Macedonian state authorities. He was elected titular Bishop of Stobi on 29 June 2006 and consecrated on 17 June 2007. In 2008 he was appointed an Administrator of the Eparchy of Strumica. Since then, he was also appointed to the duties of the First Secretary of the Holy Synod of Orthodox Ohrid Archbishopric and Editor of "Sobornost", the Archbishopric's periodical. In 2015, he was appointed member of the Commission of Serbian Orthodox Church for dialogue with self-proclaimed Macedonian Orthodox Church.

References

Sources

External links
 Personal web page of Bishop David Ninov
 Biography of the Bishop of Stobi and Administrator of Strumica David
 Bishopric of Strumica of the Orthodox Ohrid Archbishopric
 Bishop David of Stobi: 1700 years of the Edict of Milan! Free Archbishop Jovan!
 Bishop David of Stobi serves in Johannesburg

1972 births
Orthodox Ohrid Archbishopric
Eastern Orthodox Christians from North Macedonia
Living people
Clergy from Skopje
Bishops of the Serbian Orthodox Church
21st-century Eastern Orthodox bishops